The Serie B 1949–50 was the eighteenth tournament of this competition played in Italy since its creation.

Teams
Fanfulla, Udinese, Prato and Catania had been promoted from Serie C, while Livorno and Modena had been relegated from Serie A.

Events
A provisional fifth relegation was added to reduce the league.

Final classification

Results

References and sources
Almanacco Illustrato del Calcio - La Storia 1898-2004, Panini Edizioni, Modena, September 2005

Serie B seasons
2
Italy